Epidendrum katarun-yariku is a species of orchid in the genus Epidendrum found in the Guiana Highlands in Venezuela and Brazil. It grows on tepuis.

In the Arekuna language, katarun means high and yariku means flower. The specific epithet was chosen because the species occurs on the peaks and upper foothills of tepuis.

References

Orchids of Venezuela
Orchids of Brazil
Plants described in 2020
katarun-yariku
Flora of the Tepuis